Fratelli Branca, formal name Fratelli Branca Distillerie Srl, is a distillery based in Milan, Italy, that was founded in 1845. Fratelli Branca makes an amaro digestif, Fernet-Branca.

In 1925 they opened their first and only production plant outside Italy in Argentina, the country that consumes the most Fernet-Branca due to the popularity of the fernet con coca cocktail. During the following decade, the founder was joined by his sons Luigi (1833-1886), Giuseppe (1837-1888) and Stefano (1843-1891), who focused on strengthening the distribution network in Italy and abroad. On the death of Stefano Branca in 1891, a few years after that of his father and brothers, his wife Maria Branca Scala took charge of the management of a company that at that time had about fifty employees and over 300 workers, and which was awarded the following year by the Ministry of Agriculture and Commerce for being among the most distinguished companies in exporting.  In 1905 the company's trademark was officially registered - an eagle with spread wings that claw a bottle with the world below - destined for lasting notoriety and conceived by the painter Leopoldo Metlicovitz, exponent of the artistic movement of Liberty and one of the fathers of modern poster design. Italian advertising. In 2001, the company purchased from the  Carpano family of Turin the rights to produce Punt e Mes.

Fratelli Branca Distillerie is headed, together with Branca Real Estate and Centro Studi Fratelli Branca, to Branca International, controlled by the Branca family of which Niccolò Branca is President and CEO. In 2017 Branca International recorded revenues of 364.6 million euros, up 12% compared to 2016. Consolidated profit improved slightly year-on-year, from 67.2 to 68.8 million. With investments of over 9 million financed through its own resources, Branca International recorded an improvement in net liquidity, from 377 to 460 million.

Brands

 Fernet Branca
 Match Whisky (Scotch)
 Branca Menta (Liqueur)
 Branca Stravecchio (Brandy)
 Candolini (Grappa)
 Caffè Borghetti (Amaro)
 Sambuca Borghetti
 Punt e Mes (Vermouth)
 Carpano (the  first ever Vermouth (1786))
 Champagne Tsarine (Champagne)
 Sernova (Vodka) 
 Villa Branca (Winery in the Chianti Classico region of Tuscany)

References

External links

Fratelli Branca website
Villa Branca website

Distilleries in Italy
Manufacturing companies based in Milan
Companies established in 1845
Italian brands